Frontiers is the sixth studio album by Jesse Cook.  . Cook and nine other musicians recorded the album at Coach House Music in Canada. The album was mixed by Cook. All songs were written by Jesse Cook except "It Ain't Me Babe", which is a cover version of the original song by Bob Dylan, and La Llorona, a traditional Mexican folk song.

Track listing
 Matisse the Cat
 Cafe Mocha
 Rain
 Vamos
 Turning
 Havana
 El Cri
 Come What May
 It Ain't Me Babe
 La Llorona
 Waiting
 Europa
 Alone

Personnel
Credits for the album, according to Cook's official web page:

Chris Church, Violins.
Art Avalos, Percussion on "Cafe Mocha"', "Rain", "Vamos", "Turning", "Havana", "Come What May", timbales on "Matisse the Cat".
Chendy Leon, Percussion on "El Cri", "La Llorona", "Europa".
Ross MacIntire, Acoustic Bass.
Kevin Fox, Cello.
Gary Craig, Drums on "It Ain't Me Babe".
Melissa McClelland, Vocals on "It Ain't Me Babe".
Amanda Martinez, Vocals on "La Llorona".
Maryem Tollar, Vocals on "Europa".
Jesse Cook, Guitars and all instruments not listed.

Charts and certifications

References

2007 albums
Jesse Cook albums